Kahrizak is a city in Rey County, Tehran Province, Iran.

Kahrizak may also refer to:
Kahrizak, Alborz, a village in Savojbolagh County, Alborz Province, Iran
Kahrizak, Fars, a village in Bavanat County, Fars Province, Iran
Kahrizak, Razavi Khorasan, a village in Zaveh County, Razavi Khorasan Province, Iran
Kahrizak, Malard, a village in Malard County, Tehran Province, Iran
Kahrizak, Pakdasht, a village in Pakdasht County, Tehran Province, Iran
Kahrizak-e Burbur, a village in Varamin County, Tehran Province, Iran
Kahrizak District, an administrative subdivision of Rey County, Tehran Province, Iran
Kahrizak Rural District, an administrative subdivision of Rey County, Tehran Province, Iran
Kahrizak detention center, a prison

See also
Karizak (disambiguation)